The 1998 IBF World Junior Championships was an international badminton tournament held in Melbourne, Australia from 5-11 October.

Venue
This tournament was held in Sports and Aquatic Centre.

Competition

Medalists
The table below gives an overview of the individual event medal winners at the 1998 World Junior Championships.

Results

Semifinals

Finals

Medal account

References

External links
badminton.de

BWF World Junior Championships
IBF World Junior Championships
IBF World Junior Championships
B
Badminton tournaments in Australia